The Polish Highlanders Alliance of America (pl. Związek Podhalan w Ameryce Północnej) was founded in 1929 in Chicago as an organization that unites all other Góral organizations in the United States.  Most of Chicago's Góral community is concentrated on Chicago's Southwest Side along Archer Avenue where the headquarters, also known as the "Highlander Home" ("Dom Podhalan" in Polish) is located.

The Highlander House is styled as a Carpathian chalet in the traditional Zakopane Style of Architecture. Located at 4808 S. Archer Avenue in Chicago, the structure underwent renovation under the eye of famed artist Jerzy Kenar in 2005.  In 2012 the Highlander House was upgraded with state of the art audio and video equipment.

The Polish Highlanders Alliance of North America is a nonprofit organization run by an executive board. The members of the current (2011-2014) board are:
Andrzej Gedlek - president
Karolina Walkosz-Strzelec - vice president
Michal Ploskonka- vice president of economic affairs
Jozef Cikowski - vice president of cultural affairs
Malgorzata Stopka- vice president for the East Coast
Helena Studencka - general secretary
Mateusz Staszel - financial secretary
Monika Pawlikowska - treasurer
Tomasz Radecki - marshall
Jozef Fryzlewicz- Secretary of Records (minutes)
Waclaw Pilat, Jozef Krzystyniak - standard-bearer
Wojciech Dorula, Anna Zalinska - public relations
Fr. Jacek Palica, Fr. Waclaw Lech, Fr. Bartlomiej Stanowski, Fr. Slawomir Kurc, Fr. Franciszek Florczyk chaplain
Kapelmistrz: Marek Bukowski, Wladyslaw Pawlikowski

Chicago's Góral community publishes its own quarterly newspaper Podhalanin, in addition to transmitting radio programs such as "Gawędy", "Poezja i muzyka góralska", or "Na góralską nutę",  broadcasting from WPNA 1490 AM. The Polish language Chicago area daily Dziennik Związkowy (Polish Daily News) publishes a section titled Kronika podhalańska (The Highlander Chronicle).

Member organizations (circles) within the Polish Highlander Alliance of North America
 Jan Sabała's memorial circle
 Władysław Orkan's memorial circle
 Morskie Oko
 Morskie Oko - Detroit, Michigan
 Władysław Zamoyski's memorial circle
 Kazimierz Przerwa-Tetmajer's memorial circle in Passaic, New Jersey
 Inactive
 General Galica's memorial circle
 Armstrong Creek, Wisconsin
 J. Janosik’s memorial circle
 Tatra Mountains Górals in Passaic, New Jersey
 Polish Highlanders in New York
 Dr. Stefan Jarosz memorial circle
 Tatry, Uniontown, Pennsylvania
 Inactive
 Association of Polish Highlanders from Zakopane in Utica, New York
 Makow Podhalanski circle
 Giewont circle in Mount Pleasant, Pennsylvania
 Duch Knapczyk's memorial circle
 Kazimierz Przerwa-Tetmajer’s memorial circle
 Czarny Dunajec
 Maniowy
 Odrowąż Podhalański
 Szaflary
 Harklowa
 Raba Wyżna
 Witów
 Gronków
 Ciche
 Wierchy
 Spytkowice
 Dzianisz
 Zakopane
 Maruszyna
 Skawa
 Leśnica Groń
 Ludźmierz
 Chabówka
 Biały Dunajec
 Nowy Targ
 Wróblówka
 Białka Tatrzańska
 Chochołów
 Śleboda
 Poronin
 Stare Bystre
 Ski Club “Tatry”
 Babia Góra
 Kluszkowce
 Pieniny
 Ostrowsko
 Czerwienne
 Klikuszowa parish
 Kościelisko
 Ratułów
 “Podhale” Soccer Club
 Bukowina Tatrzańska
 Ząb 
 Morawczyna
 Małe Ciche
 Łopuszna
 Hubertus - Hunting circle
 Waksmund under the patronage of St. Hedwig
 Czarna Góra
 Ciche Dolne, Miętusowo parish
 Dębno
 Pieniążkowice
 Gliczarów Górny "Wierchowiany"
 Skrzypne
 Polish Highlanders in Arizona
 Nowe Bystre
 Ochotnica
 Zaskale
 Tylmanowa
 Dział
 Kruszów
 Bukowina Podszkle
 Zagórzanie of Mszana Dolna
 Florida under the patronage of Our Lady of Ludźmierz
 Polish Highlanders in Washington State
 Bustryk
 Piekielnik
 Podczerwone
 Giewont in Lemont
 Gronik
 TOPR
 Zespol Goralski "SIUMNI," Polish Highlander Folkloric Group representing Polish Highlander Alliance in Chicago (www.siumni.org and Facebook "Siumni")
and also the Brighton Park circle, Podhalan Women's Club, The Ski Club, Podhale Soccer Club.

External links
Official website of the Polish Highlanders Alliance of North America
- Oficjalny Portal Internetowy Najstarszej Polskiej Ligi Piłkarskiej w Chicago
Chicago Public Radio series on diaspora communities in Chicago, including one on Goral Music in Chicago
Info-Portal Gorale in Polish
Gorale - old photographs

Gorals
Organizations based in Chicago
Polish-American culture in Chicago
Polish-American organizations
1929 establishments in Illinois
Organizations established in 1929